Shanghai Dragon Television or Dragon TV is a provincial satellite TV station. It launched in October 1998 as "Shanghai Television" but changed its name to Dragon Television on October 23, 2003. Currently, Dragon TV's signal covers most of mainland China, Macau, Hong Kong, Taiwan and overseas in North America, Japan, Australia, Europe, Worldwide and other countries and regions landing. From September 28, 2009, the channel used standard high-definition broadcast.

History
All of Dragon TV's news programs are owned by the parent company SMG TV news production center. The center has a professional staff of 500 people a day, 7 sections provided for the Dragon TV news programs which amounts a total of five hours. It is Asia's largest open-press studio and the largest television news production and broadcasting of news organizations.
Now Available On TVB Network Vision Channel 88, Cable TV Hong Kong Channel 21, HKBN BBTV Channel 715 and the SPB TV OTT TV.

News programs include Morning, Dragon TV News Midday, and Primetime News.

References

External links
 
 
 

 
 

Television channels and stations established in 1998
Mass media companies established in 1998
Television networks in China
Mass media in Shanghai
Shanghai Media Group